Angad Hasija is an Indian television actor. He is known for his work for portraying Alekh, in Sapna Babul Ka...Bidaai in 2007 and portraying Jimmy Dhillon (JD), in Tera Rang Chadeya in 2020 on Zee Punjabi

In 2018, Angad also appeared in the Hindi music video Tere Jism with Sara Khan. 

He was recently seen on the web series Ishq Aaj Kal on ZEE5.

Currently, Angad is playing the lead role of Jimmy Dhillon (JD) in Zee Punjabi's new show Tera Rang Chadeya. It marks the first time Angad is acting in a Punjabi show. This new show is available to Watch on Zee5.

On 24 September 2020, Angad Hasija and TV actress Sara Khan were reportedly summoned by the Indian Narcotics Control Bureau (NCB) for questioning in relation to a drug probe.

Filmography

Television

References

External links

1984 births
Living people
Indian male television actors